The Divača–Koper Railway is a Slovenian 50-kilometre long railway line that connects Ljubljana and Divača with the coastal town of Koper.

Usage
The line is used by the following passenger services:

 Intercity: Maribor–Pragersko–Celje–Ljubljana–Borovnica–Postojna–Divača–Hrpelje-Kozina–Koper
 Intercity: Ljubljana–Borovnica–Postojna–Divača–Hrpelje-Kozina–Koper
 Regionalni vlak (Regional train): Ljubljana–Borovnica–Postojna–Divača–Rodik–Hrpelje-Kozina–Presnica–Koper
 Regionalni vlak (Regional train): (Sežana–) Divača–Rodik–Hrpelje-Kozina–Presnica–Črnotiče–Hrastovlje–Koper
 Regionalni vlak (Regional train): Divača–Rodik–Hrpelje-Kozina–Presnica–Podgorje–Zazid–Rakitovec

There are also many freight trains operating along this line to the port in Koper.

Track upgrade

Gallery

See also
2017 Slovenian railway referendum
2018 Slovenian railway referendum

References

Railway lines in Slovenia
Slovene Littoral
Railway lines opened in 1968